Gary Edward Hoffman (born September 28, 1961 in Sacramento, California) is a former tackle in the National Football League.

Career
Hoffman was drafted by the Green Bay Packers in the tenth round of the 1984 NFL Draft and was a member of the team that season. The following season, he played with the San Francisco 49ers.

He played at the collegiate level at Santa Clara University and is a member of the university's hall of fame.

See also
List of Green Bay Packers players

References

Players of American football from Sacramento, California
Green Bay Packers players
San Francisco 49ers players
University of California, Santa Cruz alumni
Living people
1961 births
National Football League replacement players